Sharawi is an Arabic surname which is also used as a masculine given name. People with the name include:

Surname
 Huda Sha'arawi (1879–1947), Egyptian political figure and feminist
 Magdy Galal Sharawi (born 1946), Egyptian military officer
 Muhammad Metwalli al-Sha'rawi (1911–1998), Egyptian Islamic scholar

Given name
 Sharawi Gomaa (1920–1988), Egyptian military officer and politician

Arabic masculine given names
Surnames of Egyptian origin